Mount Bou Iblan or Jbel Bou Iblane is a mountain of Taza the Fès-Meknès region of Morocco. Its altitude is

Geography
It is located in the Middle Atlas, Taza. There was a heavy snowstorm in the area of the mountain in 2009. This summit is one of the favourite destinations for hikers in the Atlas Mountains region.

See also
Middle Atlas

References

Mountains of Morocco
Geography of Fès-Meknès